Camden is a city in and the county seat of Camden County, in the U.S. state of New Jersey. Camden is part of the Delaware Valley (Philadelphia metropolitan area) and is located directly across the Delaware River from Philadelphia, the nation's sixth most populous city. At the 2020 United States census, Camden was the 14th-most populous municipality in the state, with a population of 71,791, a decrease of 5,553 (−7.2%) from the 2010 census count of 77,344, which in turn reflected a decline of 1,984 (-2.5%) from the 79,318 counted at the 2000 census. The Census Bureau's Population Estimates Program calculated that the population was 71,773 in 2021, making it the 513th-most-populous in the country. The city was incorporated on February 13, 1828. Camden has been the county seat of Camden County since the county was formed on March 13, 1844. The city derives its name from Charles Pratt, 1st Earl Camden. Camden is made up of over 20 neighborhoods. The city is part of the South Jersey region of the state.

Beginning in the early 1900s, Camden was a prosperous industrial city, and remained so throughout the Great Depression and World War II. During the 1950s, Camden manufacturers began gradually closing their factories and moving out of the city. With the loss of manufacturing jobs came a sharp population decline. The growth of the interstate highway system also played a large role in suburbanization, which resulted in white flight. Civil unrest and crime became common in Camden. In 1971, civil unrest reached its peak, with riots breaking out in response to the death of Horacio Jimenez, a Puerto Rican motorist who was killed by two police officers.

The Camden waterfront holds three tourist attractions: the USS New Jersey, the Freedom Mortgage Pavilion, and the Adventure Aquarium. The city is the home of Rutgers University–Camden, which was founded as the South Jersey Law School in 1926, and Cooper Medical School of Rowan University, which opened in 2012. Camden also houses both Cooper University Hospital and Virtua Our Lady of Lourdes Medical Center. Camden County College and Rowan University also have campuses in downtown Camden. The "eds and meds" institutions account for roughly 45% of Camden's total employment.

Camden had once been known for its high crime rate, though there has been a substantial decrease in crime in recent decades, especially since 2012, when the city disbanded its municipal police department and replaced it with a county-level police department. There were 23 homicides in Camden in 2017, the fewest in the city in three decades. The city saw 24 and 23 homicides in 2019 and 2020 respectively, the fourth-highest toll among New Jersey cities, behind Paterson, Trenton, and Newark. As of January 2021, violent crime was down 46% from its high in the 1990s and at the lowest level since the 1960s. Overall crime reports in 2020 were down 74% compared to 1974, the first year of uniform crime-reporting in the city.

History

Early history 
In 1626, Fort Nassau was established by the Dutch West India Company at the confluence of Big Timber Creek and the Delaware River. Throughout the 17th century, Europeans settled along the Delaware, competing to control the local fur trade. After the Restoration in 1660, the land around Camden was controlled by nobles serving under King Charles II, until it was sold off to a group of New Jersey Quakers in 1673. The area developed further when a ferry system was established along the east side of the Delaware River to facilitate trade between Fort Nassau and Philadelphia, the growing capital of the Quaker colony of Pennsylvania directly across the river. By the 1700s, Quakers and the Lenni Lenape Native Americans were coexisting. The Quakers' expansion and use of natural resources, in addition to the introduction of alcohol and infectious disease, diminished the Lenape's population in the area.

The 1688 order of the County Court of Gloucester that sanctioned ferries between New Jersey and Philadelphia was: "Therefore we permit and appoint that a common passage or ferry for man or beast be provided, fixed and settled in some convenient and proper place between ye mouths or entrance of Cooper's Creek and Newton Creek, and that the government, managing and keeping of ye same be committed to ye said William Roydon and his assigns, who are hereby empowered and appointed to establish, fix and settle ye same within ye limits aforesaid, wherein all other persons are desired and requested to keep no other common or public passage or ferry." The ferry system was located along Cooper Street and was turned over to Daniel Cooper in 1695. Its creation resulted in a series of small settlements along the river, largely established by three families: the Coopers, the Kaighns, and the Mickels, and these lands would eventually be combined to create the future city. Of these, the Cooper family had the greatest impact on the formation of Camden. In 1773, Jacob Cooper developed some of the land he had inherited through his family into a "townsite," naming it Camden after Charles Pratt, the Earl of Camden.

19th century 

For over 150 years, Camden served as a secondary economic and transportation hub for the Philadelphia area. However, that status began to change in the early 19th century. Camden was incorporated as a city on February 13, 1828, from portions of Newton Township, while the area was still part of Gloucester County. In 1832, Camden Township was created as a township coextensive with Camden City. The township existed until it was repealed in 1848.

One of the U.S.'s first railroads, the Camden and Amboy Railroad, was chartered in Camden in 1830. The Camden and Amboy Railroad allowed travelers to travel between New York City and Philadelphia via ferry terminals in South Amboy, New Jersey and Camden. The railroad terminated on the Camden Waterfront, and passengers were ferried across the Delaware River to their final Philadelphia destination. The Camden and Amboy Railroad opened in 1834 and helped to spur an increase in population and commerce in Camden.

Horse ferries, or team boats, served Camden in the early 1800s. The ferries connected Camden and other South Jersey towns to Philadelphia. Ferry systems allowed Camden to generate business and economic growth. "These businesses included lumber dealers, manufacturers of wooden shingles, pork sausage manufacturers, candle factories, coachmaker shops that manufactured carriages and wagons, tanneries, blacksmiths and harness makers." Originally a suburban town with ferry service to Philadelphia, Camden evolved into its own city. Until 1844, Camden was a part of Gloucester County. In 1840 the city's population had reached 3,371 and Camden appealed to state legislature, which resulted in the creation of Camden County in 1844.

The poet Walt Whitman spent his later years in Camden. He bought a house on Mickle Street in March 1884. Whitman spent the remainder of his life in Camden and died in 1892 of a stroke. Whitman was a prominent member of the Camden community at the end of the nineteenth century.

Camden quickly became an industrialized city in the latter half of the nineteenth century. In 1860 Census takers recorded eighty factories in the city and the number of factories grew to 125 by 1870. Camden began to industrialize in 1891 when Joseph Campbell incorporated his business Campbell's Soup. Through the Civil War era Camden gained a large immigrant population which formed the base of its industrial workforce. Between 1870 and 1920 Camden's population grew by 96,000 people due to the large influx of immigrants. Like other industrial cities, Camden prospered during strong periods of manufacturing demand and faced distress during periods of economic dislocation.

Early 20th century
At the turn of the 20th century, Camden became an industrialized city. At the height of Camden's industrialization, 12,000 workers were employed at RCA Victor, while another 30,000 worked at New York Shipbuilding. Camden Forge Company supplied materials for New York Ship during both world wars. RCA had 23 out of 25 of its factories inside Camden, and the Campbell Soup Company was also a major employer. In addition to major corporations, Camden also housed many small manufacturing companies as well as commercial offices.

From 1899 to 1967, Camden was the home of New York Shipbuilding Corporation, which at its World War II peak was the largest and most productive shipyard in the world. Notable naval vessels built at New York Ship include the ill-fated cruiser USS Indianapolis and the aircraft carrier USS Kitty Hawk. In 1962, the first commercial nuclear-powered ship, the NS Savannah, was launched in Camden. The Fairview Village section of Camden (initially Yorkship Village) is a planned European-style garden village that was built by the Federal government during World War I to house New York Shipbuilding Corporation workers.

From 1901 through 1929, Camden was headquarters of the Victor Talking Machine Company, and thereafter to its successor RCA Victor, the world's largest manufacturer of phonographs and phonograph records for the first two-thirds of the 20th century. Victor established some of the first commercial recording studios in Camden where Enrico Caruso, Arturo Toscanini, Sergei Rachmaninoff, Jascha Heifetz, Ignacy Jan Paderewski, Leopold Stokowski, John Philip Sousa, Woody Guthrie, Jimmie Rodgers, Fats Waller and The Carter Family among many others, made famous recordings. General Electric reacquired RCA and the remaining Camden factories in 1986.

In 1919, plans for the Delaware River Bridge were enacted as a means to reduce ferry traffic between Camden and Philadelphia. The bridge was estimated to cost $29 million, but the total cost at the end of the project was $37,103,765.42. New Jersey and Pennsylvania would each pay half of the final cost for the bridge. The bridge was opened at midnight on July 1, 1926. Thirty years later, in 1956 the bridge was renamed to the Benjamin Franklin Bridge.

During the 1930s, Camden faced a decline in economic prosperity due to the Great Depression. By the mid-1930s, the city had to pay its workers in scrip because they could not pay them in currency. Camden's industrial foundation kept the city from going bankrupt. Major corporations such as RCA Victor, Campbell's Soup and New York Shipbuilding Corporation employed close to 25,000 people in Camden through the depression years. New companies were also being created during this time. On June 6, 1933, the city hosted America's first drive-in movie theater.

Between 1929 and 1957, Camden Central Airport was active; during the 1930s, it was Philadelphia's main airport. It was located in Pennsauken Township, on the north bank of the Cooper River. Its terminal building was beside what became known as Airport Circle.

Camden's ethnic demographic shifted dramatically at the beginning of the twentieth century. German, British, and Irish immigrants made up the majority of the city at the beginning of the second half of the nineteenth century. By 1920, Italian and Eastern European immigrants had become the majority of the population. African Americans had also been present in Camden since the 1830s. The migration of African Americans from the south increased during World War II. The different ethnic groups began to form segregated communities within the city and around religious organizations. Communities formed around figures such as Tony Mecca from the Italian neighborhood, Mario Rodriguez from the Puerto Rican neighborhood, and Ulysses Wiggins from the African American neighborhood.

Late 20th century
After close to 50 years of economic and industrial growth, the city of Camden experienced a period of economic stagnation and deindustrialization: after reaching a peak of 43,267 manufacturing jobs in 1950, there was an almost continuous decline to a new low of 10,200 manufacturing jobs in the city by 1982. With this industrial decline came a plummet in population: in 1950 there were 124,555 residents, compared to just 84,910 in 1980.

The city experienced white flight, as many White residents left the city for such segregated suburbs as Cherry Hill. In the 1960s, 1,289 families were displaced due the construction of the North-South Freeway, 85% of which were nonwhite families. During the period between 1963 and 1968, about 3,000 low-income units in Camden were destroyed (most due to the freeway construction), while only around 100 low-income housing units were built during the same period. The 1970 United States Census showed a loss of 15,000 residents, which reflected an increase of almost 50% in the number of Black residents, which grew from 27,700 to 40,000, and a simultaneous decline of 30% in the city's white population, which dropped from 89,000 to 61,000. Cherry Hill saw its population double to 64,000, which was 98.7% White. The city's population, which had been 59.8% White and 39.1% Black in 1970, was 30.6% White, 53.0% Black and 15.7% Other Race in 1980. By 1990, the balance was 19.0% White, 56.4% Black and 22.9% were other races.

Alongside these declines, civil unrest and criminal activity rose in the city. From 1981 to 1990, mayor Randy Primas fought to renew the city economically. Ultimately Primas had not secured Camden's economic future as his successor, mayor Milton Milan, declared bankruptcy for the city in July 1999, which was withdrawn after the state gave the city more than $60 million in aid and assumed oversight of the city's finances.

Industrial decline
After World War II, Camden's largest manufacturing companies, RCA Victor and the Campbell Soup Company, began decentralizing their production operations. This period of capital flight was a means to regain control from Unionized workers and to avoid the rising labor costs unions demanded from the company. Campbell's kept its corporate headquarters in Camden, but the bulk of its cannery production was done elsewhere after a union worker's strike in 1934; in 1979, locally grown tomatoes from South Jersey were replaced by industrially produced tomato paste from California.

During the 1940s, RCA Victor began to relocate some production to rural Indiana to employ low-wage ethnic Scottish-Irish workers. Since 1968, RCA has employed Mexican workers from Chihuahua.

Camden's largest postwar employer, the New York Shipbuilding Corporation, founded in 1899, shut down in 1967 due to mismanagement, unrest amongst labor workers, construction accidents, and a low demand for shipbuilding.

The opening of the Cherry Hill Mall in 1961 increased Cherry Hill's property value while decreasing Camden's. Enclosed suburban malls, especially ones like Cherry Hill's, which boasted well-lit parking lots and babysitting services, were preferred by white middle-class over Philadelphia's central business district. Cherry Hill became the designated regional retail destination. The mall, as well as the Garden State Racetrack, the Cherry Hill Inn, and the Hawaiian Cottage Cafe, attracted the white middle class of Camden to the suburbs initially.

Manufacturing companies were not the only businesses that were hit. After they left Camden and outsourced their production, White-collar companies and workers followed suit, leaving for the newly constructed offices of Cherry Hill.

Unionization

Approximately ten million cans of soup were produced at Campbell's per day. This put additional stress on cannery workers who already faced dangerous conditions in an outmoded, hot and noisy factory. The Dorrance family, founders of Campbell's, made an immense amount of profit while lowering the costs of production.

Civil unrest and crime 
On September 6, 1949, mass murderer Howard Unruh went on a killing spree in his Camden neighborhood killing 13 people. Unruh, who was convicted and subsequently confined to a state psychiatric facility, died on October 19, 2009.

A civilian and a police officer were killed in a September 1969 riot, which broke out in response to accusation of police brutality. Two years later, public disorder returned with widespread riots in August 1971, following the death of a Puerto Rican motorist at the hands of white police officers. When the officers were not charged, Hispanic residents took to the streets and called for the suspension of those involved. The officers were ultimately charged, but remained on the job and tensions soon flared. On the night of August 19, 1971, riots erupted, and sections of Downtown were looted and torched over the next three days. Fifteen major fires were set before order was restored, and ninety people were injured. City officials ended up suspending the officers responsible for the death of the motorist, but they were later acquitted by a jury.

The Camden 28 were a group of anti-Vietnam War activists who, in 1971, planned and executed a raid on the Camden draft board, resulting in a high-profile trial against the activists that was seen by many as a referendum on the Vietnam War in which 17 of the defendants were acquitted by a jury even though they admitted having participated in the break-in.

In 1996, Governor of New Jersey Christine Todd Whitman frisked Sherron Rolax, a 16-year-old African-American youth, an event which was captured in an infamous photograph. Rolax alleged his civil rights were violated and sued the state of New Jersey. His suit was later dismissed.

1980s Revitalization efforts

In 1981, Randy Primas was elected mayor of Camden, but entered office "haunted by the overpowering legacy of financial disinvestment." Following his election, the state of New Jersey closed the $4.6 million deficit that Primas had inherited, but also decided that Primas should lose budgetary control until he began providing the state with monthly financial statements, among other requirements. When he regained control, Primas had limited options regarding how to close the deficit, and so in an attempt to renew Camden, Primas campaigned for the city to adopt a prison and a trash-to-steam incinerator. While these two industries would provide some financial security for the city, the proposals did not go over well with residents, who overwhelmingly opposed both the prison and the incinerator.

While the proposed prison, which was to be located on the North Camden Waterfront, would generate $3.4 million for Camden, Primas faced extreme disapproval from residents. Many believed that a prison in the neighborhood would negatively affect North Camden's "already precarious economic situation." Primas, however, was wholly concerned with the economic benefits: he told The New York Times, "The prison was a purely economic decision on my part." Eventually, on August 12, 1985, the Riverfront State Prison opened its doors, however it was closed and demolished in 2009.

Camden residents also objected to the trash-to-steam incinerator, which was another proposed industry. Once again, Primas "...was motivated by fiscal more than social concerns," and he faced heavy opposition from Concerned Citizens of North Camden (CCNC) and from Michael Doyle, who was so opposed to the plant that he appeared on CBS's 60 Minutes, saying "Camden has the biggest concentration of people in all the county, and yet there is where they're going to send in this sewage... ...everytime you flush, you send to Camden, to Camden, to Camden."

Since the early 2000s, Camden has seen a large increase in development and investment. Riverfront State Prison was torn down in 2009, replaced with walking trails and a park. The former RCA Victor building was purchased by the Dranoff Company, a Philadelphia based developer and converted into market rate apartments. Another market rate apartment complex and hotel followed in the 2010s, and Rutgers University and Rowan University have expanded their campuses over the 2010s and 2020s. Development has focused primarily on the waterfront and university/downtown areas, however Subaru moved their North American headquarters from Cherry Hill to Camden in a new campus on Admiral Wilson Boulevard in 2018.

Other notable events 

Despite the declines in industry and population, other changes to the city took place during this period:
 In 1950, Rutgers University absorbed the former College of South Jersey to create Rutgers University–Camden.
 In 1992, the state of New Jersey under the Florio administration made an agreement with GE to ensure that GE would not close the remaining buildings in Camden. The state of New Jersey would build a new high-tech facility on the site of the old Campbell Soup Company factory and trade these new buildings to GE for the existing old RCA Victor buildings. Later, the new high tech buildings would be sold to Martin Marietta. In 1994, Martin Marietta merged with Lockheed to become Lockheed Martin. In 1997, Lockheed Martin divested the old Victor Camden Plant as part of the birth of L-3 Communications.
That ship remains in Camden.

21st century
Originally the city's main industry was manufacturing, and in recent years Camden has shifted its focus to education and medicine in an attempt to revitalize itself. Of the top employers in Camden, many are education and/or healthcare providers: Cooper University Hospital, Cooper Medical School of Rowan University, Rowan University, Rutgers University-Camden, Camden County College, Virtua, Our Lady of Lourdes Medical Center, and CAMcare. The eds and meds industry itself is the single largest source of jobs in the city: 7,500 (30%) of the roughly 25,000 jobs in the city. The second-largest source of jobs in Camden is the retail trade industry, which provides roughly 3,000 (12%) jobs. While already the largest employer in the city, the eds and meds industry in Camden is growing and is doing so despite falling population and total employment: From 2000 to 2014, population and total employment in Camden fell by 3% and 10% respectively, but eds and meds employment grew by 67%.

Despite previous failures to transform the Camden Waterfront, in September 2015 Liberty Property Trust and Mayor Dana Redd announced an $830 million plan to rehabilitate the Waterfront. The project, which is the biggest private investment in the city's history, aims to redevelop  of land south of the Ben Franklin Bridge and includes plans for 1.5 million square feet of commercial space, 211 residences, a 130-room hotel, more than 4,000 parking spaces, a downtown shuttle bus, a new ferry stop, a riverfront park, and two new roads. The project is a modification of a previous $1 billion proposal by Liberty Property Trust, which would have redeveloped  and would have included  of commercial space, 1,600 homes, and a 140-room hotel. On March 11, 2016, the New Jersey Economic Development Authority approved the modified plans and officials like Timothy J. Lizura of the NJEDA expressed their enthusiasm: "It's definitely a new day in Camden. For 20 years, we've tried to redevelop that city, and we finally have the traction between a very competent mayor's office, the county police force, all the educational reforms going on, and now the corporate interest. It really is the right ingredient for changing a paradigm which has been a wreck."

In 2013, the New Jersey Economic Development Authority created the New Jersey Economic Opportunity Act, which provides incentives for companies to relocate to or remain in economically struggling locations in the state. These incentives largely come in the form of tax breaks, which are payable over 10 years and are equivalent to a project's cost. According to The New York Times, "...the program has stimulated investment of about $1 billion and created or retained 7,600 jobs in Camden." This NJEDA incentive package has been used by organizations and firms such as the Philadelphia 76ers, Subaru of America, Lockheed Martin, and Holtec International.

In late 2014 the Philadelphia 76ers broke ground in Camden (across the street from the BB&T Pavilion) to construct a new 125,000-square-foot training complex. The Philadelphia 76ers Training Complex includes an office building and a 66,230-square-foot basketball facility with two regulation-size basketball courts, a 2,800-square-foot locker room, and a 7,000-square-foot roof deck. The $83 million complex had its grand opening on September 23, 2016, and was expected to provide 250 jobs for the city of Camden.

Also in late 2014, Subaru of America announced that in an effort to consolidate their operations, their new  headquarters would be located in Camden. The $118 million project broke ground in December 2015 but was put on hold in mid-2016 because the original plans for the complex had sewage and waste water being pumped into an outdated sewage system. Adjustments to the plans were made and the project was expected to be completed in 2017, creating up to 500 jobs in the city upon completion. The building was completed in April 2018. The company also said that it would donate 50 cherry trees to the city and aim to follow a "zero landfill" policy in which all waste from the offices would be either reduced, reused, or recycled.

Several smaller-scale projects and transitions also took place during the 21st century.

In preparation for the 2000 Republican National Convention in Philadelphia, various strip clubs, hotels, and other businesses along Admiral Wilson Boulevard were torn down in 1999, and a park that once existed along the road was replenished.

In 2004, conversion of the old RCA Victor Building 17 to The Victor, an upscale apartment building was completed. The same year, the River LINE, between the Entertainment Center at the Waterfront in Camden and the Transit Center in Trenton, was opened, with a stop directly across from The Victor.

In 2010, massive police corruption was exposed that resulted in the convictions of several policemen, dismissals of 185 criminal cases, and lawsuit settlements totaling $3.5 million that were paid to 88 victims. On May 1, 2013, the Camden Police Department was dissolved and the newly formed Camden County Police Department took over full responsibility for policing the city.

As of 2019, numerous projects were underway downtown and along the waterfront, with a market-rate apartment complex and hotel opening in early 2020.

In 2022, a $2 billion expansion of Cooper University Hospital was announced, which was expected to take about a decade to complete.

Geography
According to the U.S. Census Bureau, the city had a total area of 10.34 square miles (26.78 km2), including 8.92 square miles (23.10 km2) of land and 1.42 square miles (3.68 km2) of water (13.75%).

Camden borders Collingswood, Gloucester City, Oaklyn, Pennsauken Township and Woodlynne in Camden County, as well as Philadelphia across the Delaware River in Pennsylvania. Just offshore of Camden is Pettys Island, which is part of Pennsauken Township. The Cooper River (popular for boating) flows through Camden, and Newton Creek forms Camden's southern boundary with Gloucester City.

Camden contains the United States' first federally funded planned community for working class residents, Yorkship Village (now called Fairview). The village was designed by Electus Darwin Litchfield, who was influenced by the "garden city" developments popular in England at the time.

Neighborhoods
Camden contains more than 20 generally recognized neighborhoods:

 Ablett Village
 Bergen Square
 Beideman
 Broadway
 Centerville
 Center City/Downtown Camden/Central Business District
 Central Waterfront
 Cooper
 Cooper Grant
 Cooper Point
 Cramer Hill
 Dudley
 East Camden
 Fairview
 Gateway
 Kaighn Point
 Lanning Square
 Liberty Park
 Marlton
 Morgan Village
 North Camden
 Parkside
 Pavonia
 Pyne Point
 Rosedale
 South Camden
 Stockton
 Waterfront South
 Walt Whitman Park
 Yorkship

Port
On the Delaware River, with access to the Atlantic Ocean, the Port of Camden handles break bulk, bulk cargo, as well as some containers. Terminals fall under the auspices of the South Jersey Port Corporation as well as private operators such as Holt Logistics/Holtec International. The port receives hundreds of ships moving international and domestic cargo annually and is one of the USA's largest shipping centers for wood products, cocoa and perishables.

Climate
Camden has a humid subtropical climate (Cfa in the Köppen climate classification) with hot summers and cool to cold winters.

Demographics

2020 census

Note: the US Census treats Hispanic/Latino as an ethnic category. This table excludes Latinos from the racial categories and assigns them to a separate category. Hispanics/Latinos can be of any race.

2010 Census

The city of Camden was 47% Hispanic of any race, 44% non-Hispanic black, 6% non-Hispanic white, and 3% other. Camden is predominately populated by African Americans and Puerto Ricans.

The Census Bureau's 2006–2010 American Community Survey showed that (in 2010 inflation-adjusted dollars) median household income was $27,027 (with a margin of error of +/− $912) and the median family income was $29,118 (+/− $1,296). Males had a median income of $27,987 (+/− $1,840) versus $26,624 (+/− $1,155) for females. The per capita income for the city was $12,807 (+/− $429). About 33.5% of families and 36.1% of the population were below the poverty line, including 50.3% of those under age 18 and 26.2% of those age 65 or over.

As of 2006, 52% of the city's residents lived in poverty, one of the highest rates in the nation. The city had a median household income of $18,007, the lowest of all U.S. communities with populations of more than 65,000 residents. A group of poor Camden residents were the subject of a 20/20 special on poverty in America broadcast on January 26, 2007, in which Diane Sawyer profiled the lives of three young children growing up in Camden. A follow-up was shown on November 9, 2007.

In 2011, Camden's unemployment rate was 19.6%, compared with 10.6% in Camden County as a whole. As of 2009, the unemployment rate in Camden was 19.2%, compared to the 10% overall unemployment rate for Burlington, Camden and Gloucester counties and a rate of 8.4% in Philadelphia and the four surrounding counties in Southeastern Pennsylvania.

Religion 
Camden has religious institutions including many churches and their associated non-profit organizations and community centers such as the Little Rock Baptist Church in the Parkside section of Camden, First Nazarene Baptist Church, 
Kaighn Avenue Baptist Church, and the Parkside United Methodist Church. Other congregations that are active now are Newton Monthly Meeting of the Religious Society of Friends, on Haddon Avenue and Cooper Street and the Masjid at 1231 Mechanic St, Camden, NJ 08104 .

The first Scientology church was incorporated in December 1953 in Camden by L. Ron Hubbard, his wife Mary Sue Hubbard, and John Galusha.

Father Michael Doyle, the pastor of Sacred Heart Catholic Church located in South Camden, has played a large role in Camden's spiritual and social history. In 1971, Doyle was part of the Camden 28, a group of anti-Vietnam War activists who planned to raid a draft board office in the city. This is noted by many as the start of Doyle's activities as a radical 'Catholic Left'. Following these activities, Monsignor Doyle went on to become the pastor of Sacred Heart Church, remaining known for his poetry and activism. Monsignor Doyle and the Sacred Heart Church's main mission is to form a connection between the primarily white suburban surrounding areas and the inner-city of Camden.

In 1982, Father Mark Aita of Holy Name of Camden founded the St. Luke's Catholic Medical Services. Aita, a medical doctor and a member of the Society of Jesus, created the first medical system in Camden that did not use rotating primary care physicians. Since its conception, St. Luke's has grown to include Patient Education Classes as well as home medical services, aiding over seven thousand Camden residents.

Culture 

Camden's role as an industrial city gave rise to distinct neighborhoods and cultural groups that have affected the growth and decline of the city over the course of the 20th century. Camden is also home to historic landmarks detailing its rich history in literature, music, social work, and industry such as the Walt Whitman House, the Walt Whitman Cultural Arts Center, the Rutgers–Camden Center for the Arts and the Camden Children's Garden.

Camden's cultural history has been greatly affected by both its economic and social position over the years. From 1950 to 1970, industry plummeted, resulting in close to 20,000 jobs being lost for Camden residents. This mass unemployment as well as social pressure from neighboring townships caused an exodus of citizens, mostly white. This gap was filled by new African American and Latino citizens and led to a restructuring of Camden's communities. The number of White citizens who left to neighboring towns such as Collingswood or Cherry Hill left both new and old African American and Latino citizens to re-shape their community. To help in this process, numerous not-for-profit organizations such as Hopeworks or the Neighborhood Center were formed to facilitate Camden's movement into the 21st century.

Due to its location as county seat, as well as its proximity to Philadelphia, Camden has had strong connections with its neighboring city.

On July 17, 1951, the Delaware River Port Authority, a bi-state agency, was created to promote trade and better coordinate transportation between the two cities.

In June 2014, the Philadelphia 76ers announced that they would relocate their home offices and construct a  practice facility on the Camden Waterfront, adding 250 permanent jobs in the city creating what CEO Scott O'Neil described as "biggest and best training facility in the country" using $82 million in tax incentives offered by the New Jersey Economic Development Authority.

The Battleship New Jersey, a museum ship located on the Delaware Waterfront, was a contested topic for the two cities. Philadelphia's DRPA funded millions of dollars into the museum ship project as well as the rest of the Waterfront, but the ship was originally donated to a Camden-based agency called the Home Port Alliance, who argued that New Jersey was necessary for Camden's economic growth.

Black culture 
In 1967, Charles 'Poppy' Sharp founded the Black Believers of Knowledge, an organization founded on the betterment of African American citizens in South Camden. He would soon rename his organization to the Black People's Unity Movement (BPUM). The BPUM was one of the first major cultural organizations to arise after the deindustrialization of Camden's industrial life. Going against the building turmoil in the city, Sharp founded BPUM on "the belief that all the people in our community should contribute to positive change."

In 2001, Camden residents and entrepreneurs founded the South Jersey Caribbean Cultural and Development Organization (SJCCDO) as a non-profit organization aimed at promoting understanding and awareness of Caribbean Culture in South Jersey and Camden. The most prominent of the events that the SJCCDO organizes is the South Jersey Caribbean Festival, an event that is held for both cultural and economical reasons. The festival's primary focus is cultural awareness of all of Camden's residents. The festival also showcases free art and music as well as financial information and free promotion for Camden artists.

In 1986, Tawanda 'Wawa' Jones began the Camden Sophisticated Sisters, a youth drill team. CSS serves as a self-proclaimed 'positive outlet' for the Camden' students, offering both dance lessons as well as community service hours and social work opportunities. Since its conception CSS has grown to include two other organizations, all ran through Jones: Camden Distinguished Brothers and The Almighty Percussion Sound drum line. In 2013, CSS was featured on ABC's Dancing with the Stars.

Hispanic and Latino culture 
On December 31, 1987, the Latin American Economic Development Association (LAEDA). LAEDA is a non-profit economic development organization that helps with the creation of small business for minorities in Camden. LAEDA was founded under in an attempt to revitalize Camden's economy and provide job experience for its residents. LAEDA operates on a two major methods of rebuilding, The Entrepreneurial Development Training Program (EDTP) and the Neighborhood Commercial Expansion Initiative (NCEI). In 1990, LAEDA began a program called The Entrepreneurial Development Training Program (EDTP) which would offer residents employment and job opportunities through ownership of small businesses. The program over time created 506 businesses and 1,169 jobs. As of 2016, half of these businesses are still in operation. Neighborhood Commercial Expansion Initiative (NCEI) then finds locations for these business to operate in, purchasing and refurbishing abandoned real estate. As of 2016 four buildings have been refurbished including the First Camden National Bank & Trust Company Building.

One of the longest-standing traditions in Camden's Hispanic community is the San Juan Bautista Parade, a celebration of St. John the Baptist, conducted annually starting in 1957. The parade began in 1957 when a group of parishioners from Our Lady of Mount Carmel marched with the church founder Father Leonardo Carrieri. This march was originally a way for the parishioners to recognize and show their Puerto Rican Heritage, and eventually became the modern-day San Juan Bautista Parade. Since its conception, the parade has grown into the Parada San Juan Bautista, Inc, a non-for-profit organization dedicated to maintaining the community presence of Camden's Hispanic and Latino members. Some of the work that the Parada San Juan Bautista, Inc has done include a month long event for the parade with a community commemorative mass and a coronation pageant. The organization also awards up to $360,000 in scholarships to high school students of Puerto Rican descent.

On May 30, 2000, Camden resident and grassroots organizer Lillian Santiago began a movement to rebuild abandoned lots in her North Camden neighborhood into playgrounds. The movement was met with resistance from the Camden government, citing monetary problems. As Santiago's movement gained more notability in her neighborhoods she was able to move other community members into action, including Reverend Heywood Wiggins. Wiggins was the president of the Camden Churches Organized for People, a coalition of 29 churches devoted to the improvement of Camden's communities, and with his support Santiago's movement succeeded. Santiago and Wiggins were also firm believers in Community Policing, which would result in their fight against Camden's corrupt police department and the eventual turnover to the State government.

Arts and entertainment 
Camden has two generally recognized neighborhoods located on the Delaware River waterfront, Central and South. The Waterfront South was founded in 1851 by the Kaighns Point Land Company. During World War II, Waterfront South housed many of the industrial workers for the New York Shipbuilding Company. Currently, the Waterfront is home to many historical buildings and cultural icons. The Waterfront South neighborhood is a federal and state historic district due to its history and culturally significant buildings, such as the Sacred Heart Church and the South Camden Trust Company The Central Waterfront is located adjacent to the Benjamin Franklin Bridge and is home to the Nipper Building (also known as The Victor), the Adventure Aquarium, and Battleship New Jersey.

Starting on February 16, 2012, Camden's Waterfront began an art crawl and volunteer initiative called Third Thursday in an effort to support local Camden business and restaurants. Part of Camden's art crawl movement exists in Studio Eleven One, a fully restored 1906 firehouse opened in 2011 that operated as an art gallery owned by William and Ronja Butlers. William Butler and Studio Eleven One are a part of his wife's company Thomas Lift LLC, self-described as a "socially conscious company" that works to connect Camden's art scene with philanthropic organizations.

Starting in 2014, Camden began Connect The Lots, a community program designed to revitalize unused areas for community engagement. Connect the Lots was founded through The Kresge Foundation, and the project "seeks to create temporary, high-quality, safe outdoor spaces that are consistently programmed with local cultural and recreational activities". Other partnerships with the Connect the Lots foundation include the Cooper's Ferry Partnership, a private non-profit corporation dedicated to urban renewal. Connect the Lots' main work are their 'Pop up Parks' that they create around Camden. In 2014, Connect the lots created a pop up skate park for Camden youth with assistance from Camden residents as well as students. As of 2016, the Connect the Lots program free programs have expanded to include outdoor yoga and free concerts.

In October 2014, Camden finished construction of the Kroc Center, a Salvation Army funded community center located in the Cramer Hill neighborhood at an 85-acre former landfill which closed in 1971. The Kroc Center's mission is to provide both social services to the people of Camden as well as community engagement opportunities. The center was funded by a $59 million donation from Joan Kroc, and from the Salvation Army. Camden Mayor Dana Redd on the opening of the center called it "the crown jewel of the city." The Kroc Center offers an 8-lane, 25-yard competition pool, a children's water park, various athletic and entertainment options, as well as an in center chapel.

The Symphony in C orchestra is based at Rutgers University-Camden. Established as the Haddonfield Symphony in 1952, the organization was renamed and relocated to Camden in 2006.

Philanthropy

Camden has a variety of non-profit Tax-Exempt Organizations aimed to assist city residents with a wide range of health and social services free or reduced charge to residents. Camden City, having one of the highest rates of poverty in New Jersey, fueled residents and local organizations to come together and develop organizations aimed to provide relief to its citizens. As of the 2000 Census, Camden's income per capita was $9,815. This ranking made Camden the poorest city in the state of New Jersey, as well as one of the poorest cities in the United States. Camden also has one of the highest rates of childhood poverty in the nation.

Camden was once a thriving industrialized city home to the RCA Victor, Campbell Soup Company and containing one of the largest shipping companies. Camden's decline stemmed from the lack in jobs once these companies moved over seas. Many of Camden's non-profit Organizations emerged during the 1900s when the city suffered a large decline in jobs which affected the city's growth and population. These organizations are located in all Camden sub-sections and offer free services to all city residents in an attempt to combat poverty and aid low income families. The services offered range from preventive health care, homeless shelters, early childhood education, to home ownership and restoration services. Nonprofits in Camden strive to assist Camden residents in need of all ages, from children to the elderly. Each nonprofit organization in Camden has an impact on the community with specific goals and services. These organizations survive through donations, partnerships, and fundraising. Volunteers are needed at many of these organizations to assist with various programs and duties. Camden's nonprofits also focus on development, prevention, and revitalization of the community. Nonprofit organizations serve as resources for the homeless, unemployed, or financially insufficient.

One of Camden's most prominent and longest-running organizations with a span of 103 years of service, is The Neighborhood Center located in the Morgan Village section of Camden. The Neighborhood Center was founded in 1913 by Eldridge Johnson, George Fox Sr., Mary Baird, and local families in the community geared to provide a safe environment for the city's children. The goal of Camden's Neighborhood Center is to promote and enable academic, athletic and arts achievements. The Neighborhood Center was created to assist the numerous families living in Camden in poverty. The Neighborhood Center also has an Urban Community Garden as of the year 2015. Many of the services and activities offered for the children are after school programs, and programs for teenagers are also available. These teenage youth programs aim to guide students toward success during and after their high school years. The activities at the Neighborhood Center are meant to challenge youth in a safe environment for fun and learning. These activities are developed with the aim of The Neighborhood Center helping to break the cycle of poverty that is common in the city of Camden.

Center for Family Services Inc offers a number of services and programs that total 76 free programs. This organization has operated in South Jersey for over 90 years and is one of the leading non-profits in the city. 

Catholic Charities of Camden, Inc. is a faith-based organization that advocates and uplifts the lives of the poor and unemployed. They provide services in six New Jersey counties and serve over 28,000 people each year. The extent of the services offered exceed those of any of Camden's other Non- Profit Organizations. Catholic Charities Refugee

Camden Churches Organized for People (CCOP) is an arrangement between various congregations of Camden to partner together against problems in the community. CCOP is affiliated with Pacific Institute for Community Organization (PICO). CCOP is a non-religious, non-profit organization that works with believers in the Camden to solve social problems in the community. CCOP's system for community organizing was modeled after PICO, which stresses the importance of social change instead of social services when addressing the causes of residents and their families' problems. CCOP's initial efforts began in 1995, and was composed only of two directors and about 60 leaders from the 18 churches in the organization.

Cooper Grant Neighborhood Association is located in the historic Cooper Grant neighborhood that once housed William Cooper, an English Quaker with long ties to Camden. His son Richard Cooper along with his four children are responsible for contributing to the creation of the Cooper Health System. This organizations goal is to enrich the lives of citizens living in the Cooper Grant neighborhood located from the Camden Waterfront up to Rutgers University Camden campus. This center offers community service to the citizens living in the historic area that include activism, improving community health and involvement, safety and security, housing development, affordable childcare services, and connecting neighborhoods and communities together. The Cooper Grant Neighborhood Association owns the Cooper Grant Community Garden. Project H.O.P.E organization offers healthcare to the homeless, preventive health Care, substance abuse programs, social work services, behavioral health care.

The Heart of Camden Organization offers home renovation and restoration services and home ownership programs. Heart of Camden receives donations from online shoppers through Amazon Smile. Heart of Camden Organization is partners with District Council Collaborative Board (DCCB). Heart of Camden Organization's accomplishments include the economic development of various entities such as the Waterfront South Theatre, Neighborhood Greenhouse, and a community center with a gymnasium. Another accomplishment of Heart of Camden Organization is its revitalization of Camden, which includes Liney's Park Community Gardens and Peace Park.

VolunteersofAmerica.org helps families facing poverty and is a community based organization geared toward helping families live self-sufficient, healthy lives. With a 120 years of service the Volunteers of America has dedicated their services to all Americans in need of help. Home for the Brave is a housing program aimed to assist homeless veterans. This program is a 30-bed housing program that coincides with the Homeless Veterans Reintegration program which is funded through the Department of Labor. Additional services include; Emergency Support, Community Support, Employment Services, Housing Services, Veterans Services, Behavioral Services, Senior Housing.

The Center for Aquatic Sciences was founded in 1989 and continues to promote its mission of "education and youth development through promoting the understanding, appreciation and protection of aquatic life and habitats." In performing this mission, the Center strives to be a responsible member of the community, assisting in its economic and social redevelopment by providing opportunities for education, enrichment and employment. Education programs include programs for school groups in our on-site classrooms and aquarium auditorium as well as outreach programs throughout the Delaware Valley. The center also partners with schools in both Camden and Philadelphia to embed programs during the school day and to facilitate quality educational after-school experiences. 

The center's flagship program is CAUSE (Community and Urban Science Enrichment). CAUSE is a many-faceted science enrichment program for children and youth. The program was initiated in 1993 and has gained local and regional attention as a model for comprehensive, inner-city youth development programs, focusing on intense academics and mentoring for a manageable number of youth.

Economy

About 45% of employment in Camden is in the "eds and meds" sector, providing educational and medical institutions.

Largest employers
 Campbell Soup Company
 Cooper University Hospital
 Delaware River Port Authority
 L3 Technologies, formerly L-3 Communications
 Our Lady of Lourdes Medical Center
 Rutgers University–Camden
 State of New Jersey
 New Jersey Judiciary
 Subaru of America; relocated from Cherry Hill in 2018
 Susquehanna Bank
 UrbanPromise Ministry (largest private employer of teenagers)

Urban enterprise zone
Portions of Camden are part of a joint Urban Enterprise Zone. The city was selected in 1983 as one of the initial group of 10 zones chosen to participate in the program. In addition to other benefits to encourage employment within the Zone, shoppers can take advantage of a reduced 3.3125% sales tax rate (half of the 6.625% rate charged statewide) at eligible merchants. Established in September 1988, the city's Urban Enterprise Zone status expires in December 2023.

The UEZ program in Camden and four other original UEZ cities had been allowed to lapse as of January 1, 2017, after Governor Chris Christie, who called the program an "abject failure", vetoed a compromise bill that would have extended the status for two years. In May 2018, Governor Phil Murphy signed a law that reinstated the program in these five cities and extended the expiration date in other zones.

Redevelopment

The state of New Jersey has awarded more than $1.65 billion in tax credits to more than 20 businesses through the New Jersey Economic Opportunity Act. These companies include Subaru, Lockheed Martin, American Water, EMR Eastern and Holtec.

Campbell Soup Company decided to go forward with a scaled-down redevelopment of the area around its corporate headquarters in Camden, including an expanded corporate headquarters. In June 2012, Campbell Soup Company acquired the  site of the vacant Sears building located near its corporate offices, where the company plans to construct the Gateway Office Park, and razed the Sears building after receiving approval from the city government and the New Jersey Department of Environmental Protection.

Cherokee dropped their plans in the face of local opposition and the slumping real estate market.
They are among several companies receiving New Jersey Economic Development Authority (EDA) tax incentives to relocate jobs in the city.

Lockheed Martin was awarded $107 million in tax breaks, from the Economic Redevelopment Agency, to move to Camden. Lockheed rents 50,000 square feet of the L-3 communications building in Camden. Lockheed Martin invested $146.4 million into their Camden Project According to the Economic Redevelopment Agency. Lockheed stated that without these tax breaks they would have had to eliminate jobs.

In 2013, Camden received $59 million from the Kroc estate to be used in the construction of a new community center and another $10 million was raised by the Salvation Army to cover the remaining construction costs. The Ray and John Kroc Corps Community Center, opened in 2014, is a 120,000 square foot community center with an 8,000 square foot water park and a 60 ft ceiling. The community center also contains a food pantry, a computer lab, a black box theater, a chapel, two pools, a gym, an outdoor track and field, a library with reading rooms, and both indoor and outdoor basketball courts.

In 2015 Holtec was given $260 million over the course of 10-year to open up a 600,000-square-foot campus in Camden. Holtec stated that they plan to hire at least 1000 employees within the first year of them opening their doors in Camden. According to the Economic Development Agency, Holtec is slated to bring in $155,520 in net benefit to the state by moving to Camden, but in this deal, Holtec has no obligation to stay in Camden after its 10-year tax credits run out. Holtec's reports stated that the construction of the building would cost $260 million which would be equivalent to the tax benefits they received.

In fall 2017 Rutgers University–Camden Campus opened up their Nursing and Science Building. Rutgers spent $62.5 million to build their 107,000-square-foot building located at 5th and Federal St. This building houses their physics, chemistry, biology and nursing classes along with nursing simulation labs.

In November 2017, Francisco "Frank" Moran was elected as the 48th Mayor of Camden. Prior to this, one of Moran's roles was as the director of Camden County Parks Department where he was in charge of overseeing several park projects expanding the Camden County Park System, including the Cooper River Park, as well as bringing back public ice skating rinks to the parks in Camden County.

American Water was awarded $164.2 million in tax credits from the New Jersey's Grow New Jersey Assistance Program to build a five-story 220,000-square-foot building at Camden's waterfront. American Water opened this building in December 2018 becoming the first in a long line of new waterfront attractions planned to come to Camden.

The NJ American Water Neighborhood Revitalization Tax Credit is a $985,000 grant which was introduced in July 2018. It is part of $4.8 million that New Jersey American Water has invested in Camden. Its purpose will be to allow current residents to remain in the city by providing them with $5,000 grants to make necessary home repairs. Some of the funding will also go towards Camden SMART (Stormwater Management and Resource Training). Funding will also go towards the Cramer Hill NOW Initiative, which focuses on improving infrastructure and parks.

On June 5, 2017, Cooper's Poynt Park was completed. The 5-acre park features multi-use trails, a playground, and new lighting. Visitors can see both the Delaware River and the Benjamin Franklin Bridge. Prior to 1985, the land the park resides on was open space that allowed Camden residents access to the waterfront. In 1985, the Riverfront State Prison was built, blocking that access. The land become available for the park to be built when the prison was demolished in 2009. Funding for the park was provided by Wells Fargo Regional Foundation, the William Penn Foundation, the State Department of Community Affairs, the Fund for New Jersey, and the Camden Economic Recovery Board.

Cooper's Ferry Partnership is a private non-profit founded in 1984. It was originally known as Cooper's Ferry Association until it merged with the Greater Camden Partnership in 2011, becoming Cooper's Ferry Partnership. Kris Kolluri is the current CEO. In a broad sense, their goal is to identify and advance economic development in Camden. While this does include housing rehabilitation, Cooper's Ferry is involved in multiple projects. This includes the Camden Greenway, which is a set of hiking and biking trails, and the Camden SMART (Stormwater Management and Resource Training) Initiative.

In January 2019, Camden received a $1 million grant from Bloomberg Philanthropies for A New View, which is a public art project seeking to change illegal dump sites into public art fixtures. A New View is part of Bloomberg Philanthropies larger Public Art Challenge. Additionally, the program will educate residents of the harmful effects of illegal dumping. The effort will include the Cooper's Ferry Partnership, the Rutgers-Camden Center for the Arts, the Camden Collaborative Initiative, and the Camden City Cultural and Heritage Commission, as well as local businesses and residents. Locations to be targeted include dumping sites within proximity of Port Authority Transit Corporation high speed-line, the RiverLine, and the Camden GreenWay. According to Mayor Francisco Moran, illegal dumping costs Camden more than $4 million each year.

Housing

Saint Joseph's Carpenters Society 
Saint Josephs Carpenter Society (SJCS) is a 501c(3) non-profit organization located in Camden. Their focus is on the rehabilitation of current residences, as well as the creation of new low income, rent-controlled housing. SJCS is attempting to tackle the problem of abandoned properties in Camden by tracking down the homeowners, so they can then purchase and rehabilitate the property. Since the organizations beginning, it has overseen the rehabilitation or construction of over 500 homes in Camden.

SJCS also provides some education and assistance in the home-buying process to prospective homebuyers in addition to their rehabilitation efforts. This includes a credit report analysis, information on how to establish credit, and assistance in finding other help for the homebuyers.

In March 2019, SJCS received $207,500 in federal funding from the U.S. Department of Housing and Urban Development's (HUD) NeighborWorks America program. NeighborWorks America is a public non-profit created by Congress in 1978, which is tasked with supporting community development efforts at the local level.

Failed redevelopment projects 
In early 2013, ShopRite announced that they would open the first full-service grocery store in Camden in 30 years, with plans to open their doors in 2015. In 2016 the company announced that they no longer planned to move to Camden leaving the plot of land on Admiral Willson Boulevard barren and the 20-acre section of the city as a food desert.

In May 2018, Chinese company Ofo brought its dockless bikes to Camden, along with many other cities, for a six-month pilot in an attempt to break into the American market. After two months in July 2018 Ofo decided to remove its bikes from Camden as part of a broader pullout from most of the American cities they had entered due to a decision that it was not profitable to be in these American cities.

On March 28, 2019, a former financial officer for Hewlett-Packard, Gulsen Kama, alleged that the company received a tax break based on false information. The company qualified for a $2.7 million tax break from the Grow NJ incentive of the Economic Development Authority (EDA). Kama testified that the company qualified for the tax break because of a false cost-benefit analysis she was ordered to prepare. She claims the analysis included a plan to move to Florida that was not in consideration by the company. The Grow NJ Incentive has granted $11 billion in tax breaks to preserve and create jobs in New Jersey, but it has experienced problems as well. A state comptroller sample audit ordered by Governor Phil Murphy showed that approximately 3,000 jobs companies listed with the EDA do not actually exist. Those jobs could be worth $11 million in tax credits. The audit also showed that the EDA did not collect sufficient data on companies that received tax credits.

Government

Camden has historically been a stronghold of the Democratic Party.

Local government

Since July 1, 1961, the city has operated within the Faulkner Act, formally known as the Optional Municipal Charter Law, under a Mayor-Council form of government. The city is one of 71 municipalities (of the 564) statewide that use this form of government. The governing body is comprised of the Mayor and the City Council, with all members elected in partisan voting to four-year terms of office on a staggered basis. The Mayor is directly elected by the voters. The City Council is comprised of seven council members. Since 1994, the city has been divided into four council districts, with a single council member elected from each of the four districts and three council members being elected at-large; previously, the entire council was elected at-large. The four ward seats are up for election at the same time and the three at-large seats and the mayoral seat are up for election together two years later. For three decades before 1962 and from 1996 to 2007, Camden's municipal elections were held on a non-partisan basis; since 2007, the elections have been partisan.

, the Mayor of Camden is Democrat Victor Carstarphen, whose term of office ends December 31, 2025. Members of the City Council are Council President Angel Fuentes (D, 2025; at large), Vice President Sheila Davis (D, 2025; at large), Shaneka Boucher (D, 2023; Ward 1), Christopher R. Collins (D, 2023 – elected to serve an unexpired term; Ward 2),  Felisha Reyes-Morton (D, 2023; Ward 4), Noemi G. Soria-Perez (D, 2025; at large), and Marilyn Torres (D, 2023; Ward 3).

In May 2021, the city council appointed Victor Carstarphen to serve as mayor, filling the seat expiring in December 2021 that had been held by Frank Moran until he resigned from office the previous March.

In 2018, the city had an average residential property tax bill of $1,710, the lowest in the county, compared to an average bill of $6,644 in Camden County and $8,767 statewide.

Federal, state and county representation
Camden is located in the 1st Congressional District and is part of New Jersey's 5th state legislative district.

Political corruption
Three Camden mayors have been jailed for corruption: Angelo Errichetti, Arnold Webster, and Milton Milan.

In 1981, Errichetti was convicted with three others for accepting a $50,000 bribe from FBI undercover agents in exchange for helping a non-existent Arab sheikh enter the United States. The FBI scheme was part of the Abscam operation. The 2013 film American Hustle is a fictionalized portrayal of this scheme.

In 1999, Webster, who was previously the superintendent of Camden City Public Schools, pleaded guilty to illegally paying himself $20,000 in school district funds after he became mayor.

In 2001, Milan was sentenced to more than six years in federal prison for accepting payoffs from associates of Philadelphia organized crime boss Ralph Natale, soliciting bribes and free home renovations from city vendors, skimming money from a political action committee, and laundering drug money.

The Courier-Post dubbed former State Senator Wayne R. Bryant, who represented the state's 5th Legislative District from 1995 to 2008, the "king of double dipping" for accepting no-show jobs in return for political benefits. In 2009, Bryant was sentenced to four years in federal prison for funneling $10.5 million to the University of Medicine and Dentistry of New Jersey (UMDNJ) in exchange for a no-show job and accepting fraudulent jobs to inflate his state pension and was assessed a fine of $25,000 and restitution to UMDNJ in excess of $110,000. In 2010, Bryant was charged with an additional 22 criminal counts of bribery and fraud, for taking $192,000 in false legal fees in exchange for backing redevelopment projects in Camden, Pennsauken Township and the New Jersey Meadowlands between 2004 and 2006.

Politics

As of November 6, 2018, there were 42,264 registered voters in the city of Camden. As of March 23, 2011, there were 43,893 registered voters in Camden, of which 17,403 (39.6%) were registered as Democrats, 885 (2.0%) were registered as Republicans and 25,601 (58.3%) were registered as Unaffiliated.

All Camden mayors since 1935 have been Democrats. The last Republican Camden mayor was Frederick von Nieda, who only sat in office for a year.

In the 2016 presidential election, Democrat Hillary Clinton received overwhelming support from the city of Camden. On May 11, 2016, Clinton held a rally at Camden County College. Much like prior presidential elections, Camden has heavily favored the Democratic candidate.

During his second term, Obama visited Camden in 2015 and said that "Hold you up as a symbol of promise for the nation. This city is on to something, no one is suggesting that the job is done," the president said. "It's still a work in progress." In the 2012 presidential election, Democrat Barack Obama was seeking reelection and was challenged by current Utah senator Mitt Romney then Massachusetts governor. The city overwhelmingly voted for Obama in the biggest Democratic landslide in Camden's history.

In the 2012 presidential election, Democrat Barack Obama received 96.8% of the vote (22,254 cast), ahead of Republican Mitt Romney with 3.0% (683 votes), and other candidates with 0.2% (57 votes), among the 23,230 ballots cast by the city's 47,624 registered voters (236 ballots were spoiled), for a turnout of 48.8%. In the 2008 presidential election, Democrat Barack Obama received 91.1% of the vote (22,197 cast), ahead of Republican John McCain, who received around 5.0% (1,213 votes), with 24,374 ballots cast among the city's 46,654 registered voters, for a turnout of 52.2%. In the 2004 presidential election, Democrat John Kerry received 84.4% of the vote (15,914 ballots cast), outpolling Republican George W. Bush, who received around 12.6% (2,368 votes), with 18,858 ballots cast among the city's 37,765 registered voters, for a turnout percentage of 49.9.

In the 2013 gubernatorial election, Democrat Barbara Buono received 79.9% of the vote (6,680 cast), ahead of Republican Chris Christie with 18.8% (1,569 votes), and other candidates with 1.4% (116 votes), among the 9,796 ballots cast by the city's 48,241 registered voters (1,431 ballots were spoiled), for a turnout of 20.3%. In the 2009 gubernatorial election, Democrat Jon Corzine received 85.6% of the vote (8,700 ballots cast), ahead of both Republican Chris Christie with 5.9% (604 votes) and Independent Chris Daggett with 0.8% (81 votes), with 10,166 ballots cast among the city's 43,165 registered voters, yielding a 23.6% turnout.

Transportation

Roads and highways

Interstate 676 and U.S. Route 30 run through Camden to the Benjamin Franklin Bridge on the north side of the city. Interstate 76 passes through briefly and interchanges with Interstate 676.

Route 168 passes through briefly in the south and County Routes 537, 543, 551 and 561 all travel through the center of the city.

Public transportation

NJ Transit's Walter Rand Transportation Center is located at Martin Luther King Boulevard and Broadway. In addition to being a hub for NJ Transit (NJT) buses in the Southern Division, Greyhound Lines, the PATCO Speedline and River Line make stops at the station.

The PATCO Speedline offers frequent train service to Philadelphia and the suburbs to the east in Camden County, with stations at City Hall, Broadway (Walter Rand Transportation Center) and Ferry Avenue. The line operates 24 hours a day.

Since its opening in 2004, NJ Transit's River Line has offered light rail service to communities along the Delaware River north of Camden, and terminates in Trenton. Camden stations are  Walter Rand Transportation Center, Cooper Street-Rutgers University, Aquarium and Entertainment Center.

NJ Transit bus service is available to and from Philadelphia and Atlantic City. Local service is offered on several routes.

RiverLink Ferry is seasonal service across the Delaware River to Penn's Landing in Philadelphia.

Environmental problems

Air and water pollution 
Situated on the Delaware River waterfront, the city of Camden contains many pollution-causing facilities, such as a trash incinerator and a sewage plant. Despite the additions of new waste-water and trash treatment facilities in the 1970s and 1980s, pollution in the city remains a problem due to faulty waste disposal practices and outdated sewer systems. The open-air nature of the waste treatment plants cause the smell of sewage and other toxic fumes to permeate through the air. This has encouraged local grassroots organizations to protest the development of these plants in Camden. The development of traffic-heavy highway systems between Philadelphia and South Jersey also contributed to the rise of air pollution in the area. Water contamination has been a problem in Camden for decades. In the 1970s, dangerous pollutants were found near the Delaware River at the Puchack Well Field, where many Camden citizens received their household water from, decreasing property values in Camden and causing health problems among the city's residents. Materials contaminating the water included cancer-causing metals and chemicals, affecting as many as 50,000 people between the early 1970s and late 1990s, when the six Puchack wells were officially shut down and declared a Superfund site. Camden also contains 22 of New Jersey's 217 combined sewer overflow outfalls, or CSOs, down from 28 in 2013.

CCMUA 
The Camden City Municipal Utilities Authority, or CCMUA, was established in the early 1970s to treat sewage waste in Camden County, by City Democratic chairman and director of public works Angelo Errichetti, who became the authority's executive director. Errichetti called for a primarily state or federally funded sewage plant, which would have cost $14 million, and a region-wide collection of trash-waste. The sewage plant was a necessity to meet the requirements of the Federal Clean Water Act, as per the changes implemented to the act in 1972. James Joyce, chair of the county's Democratic Party at the time, had his own ambitions in regard to establishing a sewage authority that clashed with Errichetti's. While Errichetti formed his sewage authority through his own power, Joyce required the influence of the Camden County Board of Chosen Freeholders to form his. Errichetti and Joyce competed against each other to gain the cooperation of Camden's suburban communities, with Errichetti ultimately succeeding. Errichetti's political alliance with the county freeholders of Cherry Hill gave him an advantage and Joyce was forced to disband his County Sewerage Authority.

Errichetti later replaced Joyce as county Democratic chairman, after the latter resigned due to bribery charges, and retained control of the CCMUA even after leaving his position as executive director in 1973 to run for mayor of Camden. The CCMUA originally planned for the sewage facilities in Camden to treat waste water through a primary and secondary process before having it deposited into the Delaware River; however, funding stagnated and byproducts from the plant began to accumulate, causing adverse environmental effects in Camden. Concerned about the harmful chemicals that were being emitted from the waste build-up, the CCMUA requested permission to dump five million gallons of waste into the Atlantic Ocean. Their request was denied and the CCMUA began searching for alternative ways to dispose of the sludge, which eventually led to the construction of an incinerator, as it was more cost effective than previously proposed methods. In 1975, the CCMUA purchased Camden's two sewage treatment plants for $11.3 million, the first payment consisting of $2.5 million and the final payment to be made by the end of 1978.

Contamination in Waterfront South 
Camden's Waterfront South neighborhood, located in the southern part of the city between the Delaware River and Interstate 676, is home to two dangerously contaminated areas, Welsbach/General Gas Mantle and Martin Aaron, Inc., the former of which has been emanating low levels of gamma radiation since the early 20th century. Several industrial pollution sites, including the Camden County Sewage Plant, the County Municipal Waste Combustor, the world's largest licorice processing plant, chemical companies, auto shops, and a cement manufacturing facility, are present in the Waterfront South neighborhood, which covers less than one square mile. The neighborhood contains 20% of Camden's contaminated areas and over twice the average number of pollution-emitting facilities per New Jersey ZIP Code.

According to the Rutgers University Journal of Law and Urban Policy, African-American residents of Waterfront South have a greater chance of developing cancer than anywhere in the state of Pennsylvania, 90% higher for females and 70% higher for males. 61% of Waterfront South residents have reported respiratory difficulties, with 48% of residents experiencing chronic chest tightness. Residents of Waterfront South formed the South Camden Citizens in Action, or SCCA, in 1997 to combat the environmental and health problems imposed from the rising amount of pollution and the trash-to-steam facilities being implemented by the CCMUA. One such facility, the Covanta Camden Energy Recovery Center (formerly the Camden Resource Recovery Facility), is located on Morgan Street in the Waterfront South neighborhood and burns 350,000 tons of waste from every town in Camden County, aside from Gloucester Township. The waste is then converted into electricity and sold to utility companies that power thousands of homes.

On December 12, 2018, renovation of Phoenix Park in Waterfront South was completed. The renovation was done by the Camden County Municipal Utilities Authority as well as the Camden Stormwater Management and Resource Training Initiative. According to officials, the park will improve air quality and stormwater management. Additionally, the park features walking trails providing a view of the Delaware River. Due to the project's success, it was named one of the 10 most innovative uses of federal water infrastructure funding in the country by the U.S. Environmental Protection Agency and the Environmental Council of the United States.

Superfund sites 
Identified by the EPA in 1980, the Welsbach/General Gas Mantle site contained soil and building materials contaminated with radioactive materials. Radiation became prominent when the companies used thorium, a radioactive element withdrawn from monazite ore, in the production of their gas mantles. In the late 19th century and early 20th century, Welsbach Company was located in Gloucester City, which borders Camden, and was a major producer of gas mantles until gas lights were replaced by electric lights. The fabric of the Welsbach gas mantle was put into a solution that consisted of 99% thorium nitrate and 1% cerium nitrate in distilled water, causing it to emit a white light. Operating from 1915 to 1940 in Camden, General Gas Mantle, or GGM, was a manufacturer of gas mantles and served as a competitor for Welsbach. Unlike Welsbach, General Gas Mantle used only a refined, commercial thorium solution to produce its gas mantles. Welsbach and General Gas Mantle went out of business in the 1940s and had no successors.

In 1981, the EPA began investigating the area where the companies once operated for radioactive materials. Five areas were identified as having abnormally high levels of gamma radiation, including the locations of both companies and three primarily residential areas. In 1993, a sixth area was identified. Radioactive materials were identified at 100 properties located near the companies' former facilities in Camden and Gloucester City, as well as the company locations themselves. In 1996, due to the levels of contamination in the areas, the Welsbach and General Gas Mantle site was added to the National Priorities List, which consists of areas in the United States that are or could become contaminated with dangerous substances. The EPA demolished the General Gas Mantle building in late 2000 and only one building remains at the former Welsbach site. Since it was declared a Superfund site, the EPA has removed over 350,000 tons of contaminated materials from the Welsbach/General Gas Mantle site.

The Martin Aaron, Inc. site operated as a steel drum recycling facility for thirty years, from 1968 to 1998, though industrial companies have made use of the site since the late 19th century, contaminating soil and groundwater in the surrounding area. The drums at the facility, containing residue of hazardous chemicals, were not correctly handled or disposed of, releasing substances such as arsenic and polychlorinated biphenyl into the groundwater and soil. Waste such as abandoned equipment and empty steel drums was removed from the site by the EPA and NJDEP, the latter of which initially tested the site for contamination in 1987. Like the Welsbach/General Gas Mantle site, the Martin Aaron, Inc. site was placed on the National Priorities list in 1999.

Environmental justice 
Residents of Camden have expressed discontent with the implementation of pollution-causing facilities in their city. Father Michael Doyle, a pastor at Waterfront South's Sacred Heart Church, blamed the city's growing pollution and sewage problem as the reason why residents were leaving Camden for the surrounding suburbs. Local groups protested through petitions, referendums, and other methods, such as Citizens Against Trash to Steam (CATS), established by Linda McHugh and Suzanne Marks. In 1999, the St. Lawrence Cement Company reached an agreement with the South Jersey Port Corporation and leased land to establish a plant in the Waterfront South neighborhood of Camden, motivated to operate on state land by a reduction in local taxes.

St. Lawrence received a backlash from both the residents of Camden and Camden's legal system, including a lawsuit that accused the DEP and St. Lawrence of violating the Civil Rights Act of 1964, due to the overwhelming majority of minorities living in waterfront South and the already poor environmental situation in the neighborhood. The cement grinding facility, open year-round, processed approximately 850,000 tons of slag, a substance often used in the manufacturing of cement, and emitted harmful pollutants, such as dust particles, carbon monoxide, radioactive materials, and lead among others. Also, due to the diesel-fueled trucks being used to transport the slag, a total of 77,000 trips, an additional 100 tons of pollutants were produced annually.

South Camden Citizens in Action v. New Jersey Department of Environmental Protection 
In 2001, the SCCA filed a civil rights lawsuit against the NJDEP and the St. Lawrence Cement Company. Unlike other environmental justice cases, the lawsuit itself did not include specific accusations in regard to the environment, instead focusing on racial discrimination. The SCCA accused the NJDEP of discrimination after they issued air quality permits to St. Lawrence, which would have allowed the company to run a facility that violated Title VI of the Civil Rights Act of 1964. Title VI's role is to prevent agencies that receive federal funding from discriminating on the basis of race or nationality. Waterfront South, where the cement manufacturing company would operate, was a predominantly minority neighborhood that was already home to over 20% of Camden's dangerously contaminated sites.

In April 2001, the court, led by Judge Stephen Orlofsky, ruled in favor of the SCCA, stating that the NJDEP was in violation of Title VI, as they had not completed a full analysis of the area to judge how the environmental impact from the cement facility would affect the residents of Camden. This decision was challenged five days later with the ruling of US Supreme Court case Alexander v. Sandoval, which stated that only the federal agency in question could enforce rules and regulations, not citizens themselves. Orlofsky held his initial decision on the case and enacted another ruling that would allow citizens to make use of Section 1983, a civil rights statute which gave support to those whose rights had been infringed upon by the state, in regard to Title VI.

The NJDEP and St. Lawrence went on to appeal both of Orlofsky's rulings and the Third Circuit Court of Appeals subsequently reversed Orlofsky's second decision. The appeals court ruled that Section 1983 could not be used to enforce a ruling regarding Title VI and that private action could not be taken by the citizens. The final ruling in the case was that, while the NJDEP and St. Lawrence did violate Title VI, the decision could not be enforced through Section 1983. The lawsuit delayed the opening of the St. Lawrence cement facility by two months, costing the company millions of dollars. In the years following the court case, members of the SCCA were able to raise awareness concerning environmental justice at higher levels than before; they were portrayed in a positive light by news coverage in major platforms such as The New York Times, Business Week, The National Law Journal, and The Philadelphia Inquirer, and garnered support from long-time civil rights activists and the NAACP. The SCCA has engaged in several national events since the conclusion of South Camden, such as a press conference at the U.S. Senate, the Second National People of Color Environmental Leadership Summit, and the U.S. Commission on Civil Rights environmental justice hearings, all of which dealt with the advocacy of environmental justice.

Fire department

Officially organized in 1869, the Camden Fire Department (CFD) is the oldest paid fire department in New Jersey and is among the oldest paid fire departments in the United States. In 1916, the CFD was the first in the United States that had an all-motorized fire apparatus fleet. Layoffs have forced the city to rely on assistance from suburban fire departments in surrounding communities when firefighters from all 10 fire companies are unavailable due to calls.

The Camden Fire Department currently operates out of five fire stations, organized into two battalions. Each battalion is commanded by a battalion chief, who in turn reports to a deputy chief. The CFD currently operates five engine companies, one squad (rescue-pumper), three ladder companies, and one rescue company, as well as several other special, support, and reserve units. The department's fireboat is docked on the Delaware River. Currently, the quarters of Squad 7, a rescue-pumper, located at 1115 Kaighn Ave., has been closed for renovations. Squad 7 is currently operating out of the Broadway Station. Since 2010, the Camden Fire Department has suffered severe economic cutbacks, including company closures and staffing cuts.

Fire station locations and apparatus
Below is a list of all fire stations and company locations in the city of Camden according to Battalion. The Station on Kaighns Ave. is not usable as a fire station anymore due to the fact that the flooring is too weak so Squad 7 is now relocated at the fire station at 1301 Broadway. There is an apparatus fleet of 5 Engines, 1 Squad (rescue-pumper), 1 Rescue Company, 1 Haz-Mat Unit, 1 Collapse Rescue Unit, 3 Ladder Companies, 1 Fireboat, 1 Air Cascade Unit, 1 Chief of Department, 3 Deputy Chiefs, 1 Chief Fire Marshall and 2 Battalion Chiefs Units. Each shift is commanded by two Battalion Chiefs and one Deputy Chief.

Waterfront

One of the most popular attractions in Camden is the city's waterfront, along the Delaware River. The waterfront is highlighted by its three main attractions, the USS New Jersey, the Freedom Mortgage Pavilion, and the Adventure Aquarium. The waterfront is also the headquarters for Catapult Learning, a provider of K−12 contracted instructional services to public and private schools in the United States.

The Adventure Aquarium was originally opened in 1992 as the New Jersey State Aquarium at Camden. In 2005, after extensive renovation, the aquarium was reopened under the name Adventure Aquarium. The aquarium was one of the original centerpieces in Camden's plans to revitalize the city.

The Freedom Mortgage Pavilion (formerly known as the BB&T Pavilion, Susquehanna Bank Center, and Tweeter Center) is a 25,000-seat open-air concert amphitheater opened in 1995 and renamed after a 2008 deal in which the bank would pay $10 million over 15 years for naming rights.

The USS New Jersey (BB-62) was a U.S. Navy battleship that was active between 1943 and 1991. After its retirement, the ship was turned into the Battleship New Jersey Museum and Memorial, opened in 2001 along the waterfront. The New Jersey saw action during World War II, the Korean War, the Vietnam War, and provided support off Lebanon in early 1983.

Other attractions at the Waterfront are the Wiggins Park Riverstage and Marina, One Port Center, The Victor Lofts, the Walt Whitman House, the Walt Whitman Cultural Arts Center, the Rutgers–Camden Center for the Arts and the Camden Children's Garden.

In June 2014, the Philadelphia 76ers announced that they would move their practice facility and home offices to the Camden Waterfront, adding 250 permanent jobs in the city creating what CEO Scott O'Neil described as "biggest and best training facility in the country" using $82 million in tax savings offered by the New Jersey Economic Development Authority.

Riverfront State Prison was a state penitentiary located near downtown Camden north of the Benjamin Franklin Bridge, which opened in August 1985 having been constructed at a cost of $31 million. The prison had a design capacity of 631 inmates, but housed 1,020 in 2007 and 1,017 in 2008. The last prisoners were transferred in June 2009 to other locations and the prison was closed and subsequently demolished, with the site expected to be redeveloped by the State of New Jersey, the City of Camden, and private investors. In December 2012, the New Jersey Legislature approved the sale of the  site, considered surplus property, to the New Jersey Economic Development Authority.

In September 2015, the Philadelphia-based real estate investment trust Liberty Property Trust announced its plans for a $1 billion project to revitalize Camden's Waterfront. This project plans to not only improve the infrastructure currently in place, but also to construct new buildings altogether, such as the new headquarters for American Water, which is a five-story, 222,376-square-foot office building. American Water's new headquarters on the Camden Waterfront was opened in December 2018.

Other construction projects in the Liberty Property Trust $1 billion project include a Hilton Garden Inn to be opened on the Camden Waterfront in 2020, which will contain 180 rooms, a restaurant, and space for conferences to be held. The Camden Tower, an 18-story, 394,164-square-foot office building which will be the headquarters for the New Jersey-based companies Conner Strong & Buckelew, NFI and The Michaels Organization, which is planned to finish construction in spring of 2019. Also included are apartments on 11 Cooper Street, which will be housing 156 units as well as a retail space on the ground level. The construction of these apartments is planned to be completed by the spring of 2019.

In October 2018, Liberty Property Trust announced that they would be leaving the billion dollar project behind, and selling it to anyone who is interested, as a "strategic shift." They still plan on finishing buildings in which construction has already made significant progress, such as the Camden Tower, and the Hilton Garden Inn, however, they do not wish to start any new building projects on office buildings. They have stated that they wish to focus more on industrial space projects, rather than those of office spaces. However, Liberty Property Trust is still looking to develop four parcels of land along the Delaware river that is able to hold 500,000 square feet of land to be used for office space. One such company that has made plans to take advantage of this is Elwyn, a nonprofit that assists those living with disabilities based in Delaware. In February 2019 Elwyn received approval for assistance from New Jersey's Grow NJ economic development program that will help in covering the costs of the building. This office building would be built along the Delaware river, on one of the parcels owned previously owned by Liberty Property Trust, next to the currently under construction Camden Tower.

Education

Public schools
Camden's public schools are operated by the Camden City School District. The district is one of 31 former Abbott districts statewide that were established pursuant to the decision by the New Jersey Supreme Court in Abbott v. Burke which are now referred to as "SDA Districts" based on the requirement for the state to cover all costs for school building and renovation projects in these districts under the supervision of the New Jersey Schools Development Authority. As of the 2020–21 school year, the district, comprised of 19 schools, had an enrollment of 7,553 students and 668.0 classroom teachers (on an FTE basis), for a student–teacher ratio of 11.3:1.

High schools in the district (with 2020–21 enrollment data from the National Center for Education Statistics are 
Brimm Medical Arts High School (175; 9-12), 
Camden Big Picture Learning Academy (196; 6-12), 
Camden High School (347; 9-12), 
Creative Arts Morgan Village Academy (290; 6-12), 
Eastside High School (784; 9-12) and 
Pride Academy (63; 6-12).

Charter and renaissance schools 

In 2012, The Urban Hope Act was signed into law, allowing renaissance schools to open in Trenton, Newark, and Camden. The renaissance schools, run by charter companies, differed from charter schools, as they enrolled students based on the surrounding neighborhood, similar to the city school district. This makes renaissance schools a hybrid of charter and public schools. This is the act that allowed Knowledge Is Power Program (KIPP), Uncommon Schools, and Mastery Schools to open in the city.

Under the renaissance charter school proposal, the Henry L. Bonsall Family School became Uncommon Schools Camden Prep Mt. Ephraim Campus, East Camden Middle School has become part of Mastery Charter Schools, Francis X. Mc Graw Elementary School and Rafael Cordero Molina Elementary School have become part of the Mastery charter network. The J.G Whittier Family school has become part of the KIPP Public Charter Schools as KIPP Cooper Norcross Academy.
Students were given the option to stay with the school under their transition or seek other alternatives.

In the 2013–14 school year, Camden city proposed a budget of $72 million to allot to charter schools in the city. In previous years, Camden city charter schools have used $52 million and $66 million in the 2012–2013 and 2013–2014 school years, respectively.

March 9, 2015, marked the first year of the new Camden Charter Schools open enrollment. Mastery and Uncommon charter schools did not meet enrollment projections for their first year of operation by 15% and 21%, according to Education Law Center.

In October 2016, Governor Chris Christie, Camden Mayor Dana L. Redd, Camden Public Schools Superintendent Paymon Rouhanifard, and state and local representatives announced a historical $133 million investment of a new Camden High School Project. The new school is planned to be ready for student occupancy in 2021. It would have 9th and 12th grade.

As of 2019, there are 3,850 Camden students enrolled in one of the city's renaissance schools, and 4,350 Camden students are enrolled one of the city's charter schools. Combined, these students make up approximately 55% of the 15,000 students in Camden.

Charter schools 
 Camden's Promise Charter School
 Environment Community Opportunity (ECO) Charter School
 Freedom Prep Charter School
 Hope Community Charter School
LEAP Academy University Charter School

Renaissance schools 
Uncommon Schools Camden Prep
 KIPP Cooper Norcross
 Lanning Square Primary School
 Lanning Square Middle School
 Whittier Middle School
Mastery Schools of Camden
 Cramer Hill Elementary
 Molina Lower Elementary
 Molina Upper Elementary
 East Camden Middle
 Mastery High School of Camden
 McGraw Elementary

Private education
Holy Name School, Sacred Heart Grade School, and St. Joseph Pro-Cathedral School (founded in 1894) are K–8 elementary schools operating under the auspices of the Roman Catholic Diocese of Camden. They operate as four of the five schools in the Catholic Partnership Schools, a post-parochial model of Urban Catholic Education. The Catholic Partnership Schools are committed to sustaining safe and nurturing schools that inspire and prepare students for rigorous, college preparatory secondary schools or vocations.

Higher education

The University District, adjacent to the downtown, is home to the following institutions:

 Camden County College – one of three main campuses, the college first came to the city in 1969, and constructed a campus building in Camden in 1991.
 Rowan University at Camden, satellite campus – the Camden campus began with a program for teacher preparation in 1969 and expanded with standard college courses the following year and a full-time day program in 1980.
 Cooper Medical School of Rowan University (opened 2012)
 Rutgers University–Camden – the Camden campus, one of three main sites in the university system, began as South Jersey Law School and the College of South Jersey in the 1920s and was merged into Rutgers in 1950.
 Camden College of Arts & Sciences
 School of Business – Camden
 Rutgers School of Law-Camden
 University of Medicine and Dentistry of New Jersey (UMDNJ)
 Affiliated with Cooper University Hospital
 Coriell Institute for Medical Research
 Affiliated with Cooper University Hospital
 Affiliated with Rowan University
 Affiliated with University of Medicine and Dentistry of New Jersey

Libraries
The city was once home to two Carnegie libraries, the Main Building and the Cooper Library in Johnson Park. The city's once extensive library system, beleaguered by financial difficulties, threatened to close at the end of 2010, but was incorporated into the county system. The main branch closed in February 2011, and was later reopened by the county in the bottom floor of the Paul Robeson Library at Rutgers University.

Camden also has three academic libraries; The Paul Robeson Library at Rutgers University-Camden serves Rutgers undergraduate and graduate students, as well as students from the Camden campuses of Camden County College and Rowan University. Rutgers Law School has a law library and Cooper Medical School at Rowan has a medical library.

Sports

Baseball

The Camden Riversharks and Campbell's Field
Campbell's Field opened alongside of the Benjamin Franklin Bridge in May 2001 after two years of construction. Campbell's Field was a 6,700-seat baseball park in Camden, New Jersey, United States that hosted its first regular season baseball game on May 11, 2001. The riverfront project was a joint venture backed by the state, Rutgers University, Cooper's Ferry Development Association and the Delaware River Port Authority. The construction of the ballpark was a $24 million project that also included $7 million in environmental remediation costs before building. Before the construction of Campbell's Field, the plot of land was vacant and historically known to house industrial buildings and businesses such as Campbell Soup Company Plant No. 2, Pennsylvania & Reading Rail Road's Linden Street Freight Station. The park, located at Delaware and Penn Avenues on the Camden Waterfront features a view of the Benjamin Franklin Bridge connecting Camden and a clear view of the Philadelphia skyline.

The Camden Riversharks were an American professional baseball team based in Camden. They were a member of the Liberty Division of the Atlantic League of Professional Baseball. From the 2001 season to 2015, the Riversharks played their home games at Campbell's Field, which is situated next to the Benjamin Franklin Bridge. Due to its location on the Camden Waterfront the field offers a clear view of the Philadelphia skyline. The "Riversharks" name refers to the location of Camden on the Delaware River. The Riversharks were the first professional baseball team in Camden, New Jersey since the 1904 season. On October 21, 2015, the Camden Riversharks announced they would cease operations immediately due to the inability to reach an agreement on lease terms with the owner of Campbell's Field, the Camden County Improvement Authority.

Campbell's Field was bought in August 2015 by the Camden County Improvement Authority (CCIA). In October 2015, after failing to reach an agreement with CCIA, the stadium's primary professional tenant, the Camden Riversharks, ceased operations.

After the loss of the Riversharks lease in 2015, the stadium had for the most part been unused, with its only activity being Rutgers University-Camden's home baseball games. In September 2018, a contractor was awarded the $1.1 million task of demolishing the stadium, which had cost the state and port authority around $35 million in property loans and leases. Demolition was scheduled for December 2018 and would likely continue into the following spring. The site is planned to become the host of future development projects jointly owned by Rutgers University and the city of Camden. As of spring 2019, the Rutgers baseball team will play the entirety of their season on the road, following the demolition of their home stadium. An investment totaling $15 million, planned to be split evenly between Rutgers and the city of Camden, will reportedly develop the area into a recreational complex for the city, as well as accommodations for the university's NCAA Division III sports teams.

Basketball

Philadelphia 76ers training facility

A training facility for Philadelphia's NBA team, the 76ers, had been planned for different areas, with the Camden waterfront being one of the potential sites. The team had also deliberated building on the local Camden Navy Yard, including receiving architect mock-ups of a 55,000 square foot facility for an estimated $20–25 million, but these plans didn't come to fruition. Eventually, an $82 million grant was approved by the New Jersey Economic Development Authority to begin construction of the training facility in Camden, and was scheduled to break ground in October 2014. Based on contingent hiring, the grant was to be paid out over 10 years, with the facility scheduled to host practices by 2016. The grant was somewhat controversial in that it saves the 76ers organization from paying any property taxes or fees that would be accrued by the building over its first decade. Vocal opponents of the facility claim that the site has now joined a list of large companies or industries that are invited to Camden with significant monetary incentive, at great expense to local tax payers as a form of corporate welfare.

The facility was to be divided into both player and coach accommodations, as well as office facilities for the rest of the organization. 66,230 square feet were devoted solely to the 2 full-sized basketball courts and player training facilities, while the remainder of the 125,000 square foot complex was reserved for offices and operations. While the 76ers used to share their practice facilities with the Philadelphia College of Osteopathic Medicine, they now claim one of the largest and most advanced facilities in the NBA. The training facilities include the two full-size courts, as well as a weight room, full hydrotherapy room, Gatorade Fuel Bar, full players-only restaurant and personal chef, medical facilities, film room, and full locker room. The complex will eventually provide 250 jobs, including team staff and marketing employees.

Crime

Camden once had a national reputation for its violent crime rates, although recent years have seen a significant drop in violent crime, with 2017 seeing the lowest number of homicides in three decades.

Morgan Quitno has ranked Camden as one of the top ten most dangerous cities in the United States since 1998, when they first included cities with populations less than 100,000. Camden was ranked as the third-most dangerous city in 2002, and the most dangerous city overall in 2004 and 2005. It improved to the fifth spot for the 2006 and 2007 rankings but rose to number two in 2008 and to the most dangerous spot in 2009. Morgan Quitno based its rankings on crime statistics reported to the Federal Bureau of Investigation in six categories: murder, rape, robbery, aggravated assault, burglary, and auto theft. In 2011 in The Nation, journalist Chris Hedges described Camden as "the physical refuse of postindustrial America", plagued with homelessness, drug trafficking, prostitution, robbery, looting, constant violence, and an overwhelmed police force (which in 2011 lost nearly half of its officers to budget-related layoffs).

On October 29, 2012, the FBI announced Camden was ranked first in violent crime per capita of cities with over 50,000 residents.

There were 23 homicides in Camden in 2017, the lowest since 1987 and almost half as many as the 44 murders the previous year. Both homicides and non-fatal shootings have declined sharply since 2012, when there were a record 67 homicides in the city. In 2020 there were again 23 homicides reported. 2021 saw 23 homicides and a further reduction in violent crime, contrasting national trends.

Total violent crime in the city declined in 2022, despite 28 murders and a spike of 29% in non-violent crime, highlighted by a sharp increase in car-related crime.

Law enforcement
In 2005, the Camden Police Department was operated by the state. In 2011, it was announced that a new county police department would be formed.

For two years, Camden experienced its lowest homicide rate since 2008. Camden also reorganized its police disbandment that same year. In 2011, Camden's budget was $167 million with $55 million allotted for police spending. However, the police force still experienced a budgetary shortfall when state aid fell through. Camden was rated No. 5 nationwide for homicides with approximately 87 murders per 100,000 residents in 2012. The city added crime-fighting tactics like surveillance cameras, better street lighting, and curfews for children. Although they added these tactics, the number of murders had risen again. As a last resort, officers were only authorized to use handguns and handcuffs.

Robberies, property crimes, nonfatal shooting incidents, violent crimes, and aggravated assaults have declined since 2012. In November 2012, Camden began the process of terminating 273 officers to later hire 400 new officers, out of the 2,000 applicants that have already submitted letters of interest to the county, to have a fresh start of a larger, non-unionized group to safeguard the nation's poorest city. The city's officers rejected a contract proposal from the county that would have allowed approximately all 260 Camden county's police officers to Camden Police Metro Division, to only 49% of them to be eligible to be rehired once the 141-year-old department becomes disbanded.

Although the annual homicide rate averaged 48 since 2008, in April 2013 the city reported 57 homicides in a population of 77,000 compared to 67 homicides in 2012. In mid-March 2013, Camden residents would have noticed the first changes once the first group of officers became employed and were in an eight-week field of training on the Camden streets. On May 1, 2013, Camden County's Police Department was disbanded due to a union contract that made it financially impossible to keep officers on the street. While the existing county officers were still present, Camden County's Police Department brought in 25 new officers to train in neighborhoods in hopes they can regain the communities trust. The new police force had lower salaries along with fewer benefits than they had received from the city. Because of the reorganized force in 2013, the number of cops in the streets has increased and spread throughout Camden. Camden's new police force began patrolling in tandem, speaking with residents, and driving patrol cars. Camden County Police Department hosted several Meet Your Officers events to further engage with residents.

In 2018, the Camden County Police Department reported that violent crime had dropped 18%, led by a 21% decline in aggravated assaults; nonviolent crimes fell by 12%, the number of arson fell by 29%, burglaries by 21%, and nonfatal "shooting hit incidents" dropped by 15%. In 2017 there were 23 homicides reported, which was a 30-year low. In 2018, 2019, and 2020 there were 22, 24, and 23 homicides respectively.

A CNN report proposed that Camden might be a model for what police abolition or "defunding the police" could look like. The report noted that Camden still had a police force, but it was being administered by a different body and had changed some of its procedures and policies. A report in The Morning Call noted that the county police department, which is distinct from the county sheriff's office and operates solely in Camden, had a budget of $68.5 million in 2020, compared to the city department's $55 million in 2011 prior to its dissolution, and that police funding in Camden was higher on a per capita basis than that of other NJ cities with city-run departments. There are 380 officers in the county-run department, versus 370 in the dissolved city force.

Points of interest
 Adventure Aquarium – Originally opened in 1992, it re-opened in its current form in May 2005 featuring about 8,000 animals living in varied forms of semi-aquatic, freshwater, and marine habitats.
 Waterfront Music Pavilion – An outdoor amphitheater/indoor theater complex with a seating capacity of 25,000. Formerly known as the Susquehanna Bank Center.
 Battleship New Jersey Museum and Memorial – Opened in October 2001, providing access to the battleship USS New Jersey that had been towed to the Camden area for restoration in 1999.
 Harleigh Cemetery – Established in 1885, the cemetery is the burial site of Walt Whitman, several Congressmen, and many other South Jersey notables.
 Walt Whitman House
 National Register of Historic Places listings in Camden County, New Jersey

In popular culture
The fictional Camden mayor Carmine Polito in the 2013 film American Hustle is loosely based on 1970s Camden mayor Angelo Errichetti.

The 1995 film 12 Monkeys contains scenes on Camden's Admiral Wilson Boulevard.

Notable people

Actors and actresses

 Christine Andreas (born 1951), Broadway actress and singer
 James Cardwell (1921–1954), actor, The Fighting Sullivans
 Joanna Cassidy (born 1944), actress
 Jimmy Conlin (1884–1962), character actor
 Chas. Floyd Johnson (born 1941), television producer and actor, The Rockford Files, Magnum, P.I., and Red Tails
 Edward Lewis (1919–2019), film producer and writer, Spartacus and for his collaborations with John Frankenheimer, producing or executive producing nine films together
 Ann Pennington (1893–1971), Broadway actress, dancer, and singer, Ziegfeld Follies and George White's Scandals
 Jim Perry (1933–2015), television game show host, singer, announcer, and performer
 Tasha Smith (born 1969), actress, director, and producer, Boston Common

Architects and artists

 Vernon Howe Bailey (1874–1953), artist
 Stephen Decatur Button (1813–1897), architect
 Alex Da Corte (born 1980), visual artist
 Jona Frank (born 1966), portrait photographer and author, Cherry Hill; A Childhood Reimagined
 Mickalene Thomas (born 1970), artist

Athletes 

 Max Alexander (born 1981), boxer
 Rashad Baker (born 1982), professional football safety, Buffalo Bills, Minnesota Vikings, New England Patriots, and Oakland Raiders
 Martin V. Bergen (1872–1941), college football coach
 Art Best (1953–2014), football running back who played three seasons in the National Football League with the Chicago Bears and New York Giants
 Audrey Bleiler (1933–1975), infielder who played in All-American Girls Professional Baseball League for 1951–1952 South Bend Blue Sox champion teams
 Fran Brown (born 1982), co-defensive coordinator and assistant head coach of the Temple Owls football
 Jordan Burroughs (born 1988), Olympic champion in freestyle wrestling who won Gold at the London Olympics in 2012
 Sean Chandler (born 1996), safety for the New York Giants of the National Football League
 Frank Chapot (1932–2016), Olympic silver medalist equestrian
 James A. Corea (1937–2001), radio personality and specialist in nutrition, rehabilitation and sports medicine
 Joseph W. Cowgill (1908–1986), politician who served as the Minority Leader of the New Jersey Senate.
 Donovin Darius (born 1975), professional football player for Jacksonville Jaguars
 Rachel Dawson (born 1985), field hockey midfielder
 Rawly Eastwick (born 1950), Major League Baseball pitcher who won two games in 1975 World Series
 Shaun T. Fitness (born 1978), motivational speaker, fitness trainer and choreographer best known for his home fitness programs T25, Insanity and Hip-Hop Abs
 Jamaal Green (born 1980), American football defensive end who played in the NFL for the Philadelphia Eagles, Chicago Bears, and the Washington Redskins
 Brad Hawkins (born 1998), American football safety, who played for the New England Patriots of the National Football League.
 George Hegamin (born 1973), offensive lineman who played for NFL's Dallas Cowboys, Philadelphia Eagles and Tampa Bay Buccaneers
 Harry Higgs (born 1991), professional golfer
 Andy Hinson (born ), retired American football head coach of the Bethune–Cookman University Wildcats football team from 1976 to 1978 and of the Cheyney University of Pennsylvania Wolves from 1979 to 1984
 Steve Hoffman (born 1958), senior assistant for special teams for the Atlanta Falcons
 Kenny Jackson (born 1962), former wide receiver for the Philadelphia Eagles and co-owner of Kenny's Korner Deli
 Sig Jakucki (1909–1979), former Major League pitcher for the St. Louis Browns, whose victory over the New York Yankees in the final game of the 1944 season gave the Browns their only pennant
 Jaryd Jones-Smith (born 1995), American football offensive tackle for the Las Vegas Raiders of the NFL
 Mike Moriarty (born 1974), former Major League infielder for the Baltimore Orioles
 Ray Narleski (1928–2012), baseball player with Cleveland Indians and Detroit Tigers
 Harvey Pollack (1922–2015), director of statistical information for the Philadelphia 76ers, who at the time of his death was the only person still working for the NBA since its inaugural 1946–1947 season
 Dwight Muhammad Qawi (born 1953), boxing world light-heavyweight and cruiserweight champion, International Boxing Hall of Famer known as the "Camden Buzzaw"
 Haason Reddick (born 1994), linebacker for the Philadelphia Eagles of the National Football League
 Buddy Rogers (1921–1992), professional wrestler, NWA World Heavyweight Champion and inaugural WWWF World Heavyweight Champion
 Mike Rozier (born 1961), collegiate and professional football running back who won Heisman Trophy in 1983
 George Savitsky (1924–2012), offensive tackle who played in the National Football League for the Philadelphia Eagles
 Art Still (born 1955), collegiate and professional football defensive end and cousin to Devon Still
 Devon Still (born 1989), collegiate and professional football defensive end
 Billy Thompson (born 1963), college and professional basketball player who played for the Los Angeles Lakers and Miami Heat
 Sheena Tosta (born 1982), hurdler, Olympic silver medalist 2008
 Frank Townsend (1933–1965), professional wrestler and musician
 Dajuan Wagner (born 1983), professional basketball player for Cleveland Cavaliers, 2002–2005, and Polish team Prokom Trefl Sopot
 Jersey Joe Walcott (1914–1994), boxing world heavyweight champion, International Boxing Hall of Famer
 Bo Wood (born 1945), former American football player and high school coach, who played in the NFL for the Atlanta Falcons.

Authors, poets, and writers

 Betty Cavanna (1909–2001), author, teen romance novels, mysteries, and children's books
 David Aaron Clark (1960–2009), author, musician, pornographic actor, and pornographic video director
 Andrew Clements (1949–2019), writer of children's books, known for his debut novel Frindle
 Michael Lisicky (born 1964), non-fiction writer and oboist with the Baltimore Symphony Orchestra
 Nick Virgilio (1928–1989), haiku poet
 Walt Whitman (1819–1892), essayist, journalist, and poet

Military

 Joe Angelo (1896–1978), U.S. Army veteran of World War I and recipient of the Distinguished Service Cross
 Mary Ellen Avery (1927–2011), pediatrician whose research led to development of successful treatment for Infant respiratory distress syndrome
 Boston Corbett (1832–1894), Union Army soldier who killed John Wilkes Booth
John P. Van Leer (1825–1862), Union Army officer

Musicians

 Graham Alexander (born 1989), singer-songwriter, entertainer, and entrepreneur, Rain: A Tribute to the Beatles and Let It Be and founder, of Victor Talking Machine Co.
 Butch Ballard (1918–2011), jazz drummer who performed with Louis Armstrong, Count Basie and Duke Ellington
 Paul Baloche (born 1962), Christian music artist, worship leader, and singer-songwriter
 Carla L. Benson, vocalist
 Cindy Birdsong (born 1939), vocalist, The Supremes
 Nelson Boyd (1928–1985), jazz bassist
 Vedra Chandler (born 1980), singer and dancer
 Russ Columbo (1908–1934), baritone, songwriter, violinist and actor
 Buddy DeFranco (1923–2014), jazz clarinetist
 Sam Dockery (1929–2015), hard bop pianist
 Wayne Dockery (1941–2018), jazz double bassist
 Nick Douglas (born 1967), musician
 Lola Falana (born 1942), singer and dancer
 Heather Henderson (born 1973), singer, model, podcaster, actress and Dance Party USA performer
 Richard "Groove" Holmes (1931–1991), jazz organist
 Leon Huff (born 1942), songwriter and record producer
 Barbara Ingram (1947–1994), R&B background singer
 Eric Lewis (born 1973), pianist popularly known as ELEW
 Ronny J (born 1992), record producer, rapper, and singer
 Anna Sosenko (1909–2000), songwriter and manager
 Richard Sterban (born 1943), bass singer, Oak Ridge Boys
 Frank Tiberi (born 1928), band leader, Woody Herman Orchestra
 Tye Tribbett (born 1976), gospel music singer, songwriter, keyboardist, and choir director
 Julia Udine (born 1993), singer and actress, Christine Daaé in The Phantom of the Opera on Broadway
 Jack Vees (born 1955), composer and bassist
 Crystal Waters (born 1967), house and dance music singer and songwriter, "Gypsy Woman" and "100% Pure Love"
 Buster Williams (born 1942), jazz bassist

Politicians and public officials

 John F. Amodeo (born 1950), politician who served in the New Jersey General Assembly, where he represented the 2nd Legislative District from 2008 to 2014.
 Rob Andrews (born 1957), U.S. representative for New Jersey's 1st congressional district, served 1990–2014
 David Baird Jr. (1881–1955), U.S. Senator from 1929 to 1930, unsuccessful Republican nominee for governor in 1931
 David Baird Sr. (1839–1927), United States Senator from New Jersey
 Arthur Barclay (born 1982), politician who served on the Camden City Council for two years and has represented the 5th Legislative District in the New Jersey General Assembly since 2016
 U. E. Baughman (1905–1978), head of United States Secret Service from 1948 to 1961
 William J. Browning (1850–1920), represented New Jersey's 1st congressional district in U.S. House of Representatives, 1911–1920
 William T. Cahill (1912–1996), politician who served six terms in the U.S. House of Representatives (1958–1970) and as Governor of New Jersey (1971–1975)
 Bonnie Watson Coleman (born 1945), politician who has served as the U.S. representative for New Jersey's 12th congressional district since 2015
 Mary Keating Croce (1928–2016), politician who served in the New Jersey General Assembly for three two-year terms, from 1974 to 1980, before serving as the Chairwoman of the New Jersey State Parole Board in the 1990s
 Lawrence Curry (1936–2018), educator and politician who served in the Pennsylvania House of Representatives from 1993 to 2012, was born in Camden
 James Dellet (1788–1848), politician and a member of the United States House of Representatives from Alabama
 Angel Fuentes (born 1961), former Assmblyman who has served as President of the Camden city council
 Carmen M. Garcia, former Chief judge of Municipal Court in Trenton, New Jersey
 John J. Horn (1917–1999), labor leader and politician who served in both houses of the New Jersey Legislature before being nominated to serve as commissioner of the New Jersey Department of Labor and Industry
 Robert S. MacAlister (1897–1957), Los Angeles City Council member, 1934–1939
 Richard Mroz, President of the New Jersey Board of Public Utilities
 Donald Norcross (born 1958), U.S. Congressman representing New Jersey's 1st congressional district
 Christine O'Hearn (born 1969), lawyer serving as a United States district judge of the United States District Court for the District of New Jersey
 Francis F. Patterson Jr. (1867–1935), represented New Jersey's 1st congressional district in U.S. House of Representatives, 1920–1927
 William T. Read (1878–1954), lawyer, President of the New Jersey Senate, and Treasurer of New Jersey
 William Spearman (born 1958), politician who has represented the 5th Legislative District in the New Jersey General Assembly since 2018
 John F. Starr (1818–1904), represented New Jersey's 1st congressional district in U.S. House of Representatives, 1863–1867

Other 

 Margaret Giannini (1921–2021), physician and specialist in assistive technology and rehabilitation, who was the first director of the National Institute of Disability Rehabilitation Research
 Elie Honig, attorney and CNN senior legal analyst
 Richard Hollingshead (1900–1975), inventor of the drive-in theater
 Aaron McCargo Jr. (born 1971), chef and television personality who hosts Big Daddy's House, a cooking show on Food Network
 Lucy Taxis Shoe Meritt (1906–2003), classical archaeologist and a scholar of Greek architectural ornamentation and mouldings
 Thomas J. Osler (born ), mathematician, former national champion distance runner, and author
 Jim Perry (1933–2015), game show host and television personality
 Tommy Roberts (born 1928), radio and TV broadcaster who launched simulcast in 1984, a television feed of horse races to racetracks, casinos and off-track betting facilities, enabling gamblers to watch and bet on live racing from all over the world
 Howard Unruh, (1921–2009), 1949 mass murderer
 Richard Valeriani (1932–2018), former White House correspondent and diplomatic correspondent with NBC News in the 1960s and 1970s
 Mary Schenck Woolman (1860–1940), pioneer in vocational education for women
 Phil Zimmermann (born 1954), programmer who developed the Pretty Good Privacy method of data encryption

References

External links

 
 Invincible Cities: A Visual Encyclopedia of the American Ghetto, documentary photography of Camden by Camilo José Vergara and Rutgers University
 

 
1626 establishments in the Dutch Empire
1626 establishments in North America
1828 establishments in New Jersey
Cities in Camden County, New Jersey
County seats in New Jersey
Faulkner Act (mayor–council)
New Jersey Urban Enterprise Zones
Populated places established in 1626
Populated places established in 1828
Port cities and towns in New Jersey
Urban decay in the United States
Establishments in New Netherland
New Jersey populated places on the Delaware River